In enzymology, a geissoschizine dehydrogenase is an enzyme that catalyzes the chemical reaction

geissoschizine + NADP+  4,21-didehydrogeissoschizine + NADPH

Thus, the two substrates of this enzyme are geissoschizine and NADP+, whereas its two products are 4,21-didehydrogeissoschizine and NADPH.

This enzyme belongs to the family of oxidoreductases, specifically those acting on the CH-CH group of donor with NAD+ or NADP+ as acceptor.  The systematic name of this enzyme class is geissoschizine:NADP+ 4,21-oxidoreductase. This enzyme participates in indole and ipecac alkaloid biosynthesis.

References

 

EC 1.3.1
NADPH-dependent enzymes
Enzymes of unknown structure